Stanton Fisher is a financial claims firm in United Kingdom. It deals in products such as payment protection insurance (PPI), interest rate swaps and mis-sold mortgages claims.

History

Please note : Stanton Fisher is no longer managing claims.

Stanton Fisher was established in 2010 in Manchester, United Kingdom. The firm once specialised in Interest Rate Swap Claims, Mis-sold Payment Protection Insurance Claims, Mis-sold Mortgage and Investment Claims until 2019.

In 2013, Stanton Fisher assisted a large group of Britons involved in a scandal in which banks improperly sold customers tens of billions of pounds of insurance and other financial products over two decades. U.K. banks have given out £11.5 billion ($18.7 billion) to millions of customers, and have set aside another £7.3 billion for possible future payouts.

In 2014, Stanton Fisher handled around 8,000 claims against banks over mis-sold payment protection insurance (PPI) in Republic of Ireland. An independent study ordered by the Central Bank into Irish banks’ PPI selling activities said that banks should refund €67m to the customers. Although Stanton Fisher managing director estimated it to be around €500m.

In 2015, Stanton Fisher represented numerous women with Poly Implant Prothèse (PIP) implants in UK and Ireland. The implant materials, made by French company, were used widely across the world from the mid-1990s and it emerged in 2010 that company had been using a grade of silicone intended for use in mattresses.

References

Companies based in Manchester